Milly-la-Forêt is a commune in the Essonne department in the Île-de-France region in northern France.

Geology
The Forest of Fontainebleau, in the western end of which Milly-la-Forêt lies, is composed of the Oligocene Fontainebleau sands, which are a marine deposit, laid down in an intertidal zone.

History
Milly-la-Forêt is the probable birthplace of Wulfram of Sens, Saint Wulfram; in about 640.

Origin of the place name
The first name of this domaine was called Maurillac in Gaul, Mauriliaco on a Merovingien coin, became Maureliacum, Melliacum in 667, Milliacum in Latin. The place name Milly is relatively current; it refers to an antic presence of a villa rustica owned during the Gallo-Romaine era by a certain Milius or Emilius. Hereby, the name was imported in 1080 by the knight Adam de Milly, originally from Milly-en-Beauvaisis and first lord of the place. But a charter dated from 651 mentioned already the name Melliacus. In the 13th century more accuracy was added to the place, Miliacum in Gastineto in 1267, which gave the name Milly-en-Gâtinais without being official. Upon a request from the municipal council and by a statutory order from 6 February 1948, the name was replaced by Milly-la-Forêt, considered at that time as the most touristic place and to differentiate it from its homonym Milly in Normandy.

The village

Milly contains several facilities: such as the Collège Jean Rostand, the Conservatoire des Deux Vallées, a gymnasium and sports ground complex, a multimedia library, a swimming pool, a bus station, dealers in craft products and so on. There is a market every Thursday in the very impressive late medieval market hall, built in 1479.

The yearly calendar includes attic-clearing sales; at the opening of the summer holiday period, the town celebrates la Saint-Pierre, a fair is organised and there are several fairground rides and other attractions, as well as cultural stands for the sale of specialist food and craft products.

Economy
 Milly produces many culinary and medicinal herbs. The firm of Daregal is a world leader and began in 1887 under the leadership of the Darbonne family who still run the enterprise.
 The Conservatoire National des Plantes à Parfum, Médicinales, Aromatiques et Industrielles is a botanical garden situated in a former farm.

Culture

 Christian Dior and Jean Cocteau have made their homes here. Cocteau died in 1963. Towards the end of the 1950s Jean Cocteau decorated the chapelle Saint-Blaise, which dates from the twelfth century. His theme was those medicinal and culinary herbs on which the renown of Milly rests. He is now buried in the chapel.
 Le Cyclop, a monumental sculpture in the forest of Milly-la-Forêt, constructed by Jean Tinguely in collaboration with Niki de Saint Phalle
 the 15th century covered market

Twin towns
Milly-la-Forêt is twinned with the German town of Morsbach, situated in the valley of the Sieg to the east of Cologne and with Forest Row in East Sussex, England.

Famous people
Many popular characters are born, died or lived in Milly-la-Forêt:

Dagobert I (v.602–638 or 639), King of the Francs was sacred at Milly.
Wulfram of Sens (647–703), archbishop of Sens and Saint was born there.
Louis IX (1214–1270), King of France lived there
Hugues II de Bouville (1240–1304), chamberlain of Philip the Fair and lord of Bouville.
Hugues III de Bouville (1275–1331), his son, chamberlain of Philip the Fair who owned the castle.
Olivier V de Clisson (1336–1407), owner of the castle of Milly.
Charles VI (1368–1422), King of France lived there.
Louis XI (1423–1483), King of France lived there.
Henri IV (1553–1610), King of France lived there.
Jacques Nicolas Bellavène (1770–1826), General of division he did there.
Napoléon Bonaparte (1769–1821), Emperor of French lived there.
Jean Cocteau (1889–1963), poet and graphist he lived and died there.
Christian Dior (1905–1957), dressmaker, he lived there.
Jean Marais (1913–1998), actor, he lived there.
Jean Tinguely (1925–1991), artist, worked there.
Jean-Marie Gustave Le Clézio (1940– ), writer and awarded from the Nobel Prize in Literature, lived there.

References

Dercourt, J. Géologie et Géodynamique de la France Outre-mer et Européenne 3rd edition (2002) 
Anon Carte géologique de la France à l'échelle du millionème 6th edition (2003)

External links

All these links are in French (except for the second link which offers English, Spanish, German and French).
Milly-la-Forêt official website
The Cyclop
Pictures of the town
Milly 1900 (postcards & text)

Mayors of Essonne Association 

Communes of Essonne